Ophtalmibidion oculatum is a species of beetle in the family Cerambycidae. It was described by Martins in 1969.

References

Neoibidionini
Beetles described in 1969